HMS Polychrest is a fictional naval vessel from Patrick O'Brian's Aubrey–Maturin series of historical novels about the Royal Navy during the Napoleonic Wars. The ship features in the second book in the series, Post Captain, and is a very unconventional sloop-of-war with sharp ends at both bow and stern, no tumblehome (inward curvature at the top of the hull), drop keels (similar to daggerboards on some modern sail boats), and the remnants of the launching system for an unsuccessful secret weapon (a giant rocket).

The physical form of Polychrest (except for the secret weapon) was taken from the real Dart class of sloops.  The sliding keels, originally designed by Captain John Schank, were employed upon a number of small Royal Navy vessels around this period, although problems with leaking centerboard cases perhaps discouraged wider experimentation.  Unlike Polychrest with her extraordinary leeway and propensity for missing stays, the real Dart and her sister ship Arrow performed satisfactorily during their Royal Navy service.  Dart was broken up in 1809 and Arrow captured by two French frigates in 1805. O'Brian likely took the poor sailing qualities of Polychrest and perhaps the notion of a new secret weapon from HMS Project. Project was a much smaller vessel than Dart or Polychrest with a very shallow draft to carry a new design of howitzer into coastal waters. Project was broken up in 1810 after only five years of service.

Aubrey, having heard of the ship before, upon being offered command reflected that "she was known as the 'Carpenter's Mistake', and no one in the service had ever imagined she would be launched.".  After several months of service in the English Channel, Polychrest is severely damaged after running aground during a raid on a French port, and sinks soon thereafter.

See also

 HMS Sophie
 HMS Surprise
 Notable fictional Royal Navy ship names
 List of fictional ships

Notes 
 See Brian Lavery Jack Aubrey's Ships. An essay that first appeared in Patrick O'Brian, Critical Appreciations and a Bibliography, A. E. Cunningham (ed.) published by The British Library and was reprinted in the HarperCollins edition of P. O'Brian Mauritius Command (pages 319 - 332) 
 Patrick O'Brian, Post Captain p. 175, 

Polychrest
Polychrest